Harris Jayaraj (born 8 January 1975) is an Indian composer from Chennai, Tamil Nadu. He composes soundtracks predominantly for Tamil films, while also having composed for a few films in Telugu and two films in Hindi.

He has been honoured with Kalaimamani Award from the Government of Tamil Nadu and the Life Time Achievement Award from Konijeti Rosaiah, the Governor of Tamil Nadu. Since 2001, he has won 6 Filmfare Awards South and has received 20 Filmfare Awards South nominations. He has also won 6 Mirchi Music Awards, 5 Vijay Awards, 4 Tamil Nadu State Film Awards, 3 International Tamil Film Awards and Big FM Awards.  In 2019, he was bestowed with the Dr. M.G.R. Educational and Research Institute Honorary Doctorate of Letters for his significant contributions to Tamil cinema music.

Early life

Harris Jayaraj was born and brought up in Chennai in a pious Christian family. His father hails from a Tamil Christian family and his mother from a Hindu Naidu family. He studied at Krishnaswamy Matric School. At age six, Harris began his formal training in carnatic music. His father, S. M. Jayakumar, was a noted film guitarist and have frequently colabrated with T. M. Soundararajan, A. L. Raghavan, M.S.Viswanathan, Soolamangalam Sisters, K. J. Yesudas, S. Janaki, Shankar Ganesh, S.P.Balasubramaniam, K. V. Mahadevan, Malaysia Vasudevan, L. R. Eswari, Jikki, K. Jamuna Rani, P.Susheela and Malayalam music director Shyam. Following two distressing bomb blast incidents he became more religiously inclined and young Harris had to take over the family responsibility. His father wanted him to become a guitarist and made him learn classical guitar from Mr. A. Abdul Sattar.

Harris scored the highest mark in Asia on his 4th grade exam of Trinity College of Music, London. He started his music career as a guitarist in 1987 at age twelve under M. S. Viswanathan's assistant Joseph Krishna. Harris could pursue his academics only up to High School, by then he always had problem with his attendance due to his recording sessions. Having been trained in classical guitar, Harris completed Grade VIII exams conducted by the Trinity College, London. Later he started playing keyboard and developed interest over synthesizers. For this there was no tutor. He then started programming with his Roland MC-500 and went on to work as a programmer under more than twenty five music directors in Tamil, Telugu, Hindi, Kannada, Malayalam, Bengali, Bhojpuri, Marathi, Punjabi and Oriya working in more than 600 projects till the year 2000. Between 1987 to 2000, he worked under noted composers including Raj–Koti, A. R. Rahman, Sadhu Kokila, Mani Sharma, Karthik Raja, Yuvan Shankar Raja, Sirpi, Suresh Peters, Chandrabose, Shyam, Ouseppachan, Adithyan and Vidyasagar. In his early years as a musician, Harris have worked in movie soundtracks and film scores of various popular movies including Mudhalvan,Taj Mahal, Jeans, Kandukondain Kandukondain, Ullasam, Poovellam Kettuppar, Muthu, Padayappa, Ratchagan, Aravindhan, Indian, Seevalaperi Pandi and Asuran. While working as an additional programmer under A. R. Rahman, he composed music for various television commercials including a Coca-Cola commercial featuring actor Vijay. In his early years, he admired music composers M. S. Viswanathan, Ennio Morricone, A. R. Rahman, Salil Chowdhury, and Hans Zimmer.

Film career

Harris debuted as a composer with Gautham Vasudev Menon's Minnale. The album was well received, particularly the song Vaseegara sang by Bombay Jayashri was exceptionally popular. He received the Filmfare Award for Best Music Director – Tamil for his work in Minnale, breaking the 9 years continuous record of A. R. Rahman. The following soundtrack albums 12B and Majunu met with high acclaim and praise. He also composed for the Hindi remake of Minnale titled Rehnaa Hai Terre Dil Mein, also directed by Gautham Menon. Most of the tunes from the Tamil version were retained in the Hindi version too, and only two fresh tunes were composed. He then worked in Lesa Lesa directed by Priyadarshan. The title track of Lesa Lesa was the first song in India to be released as a single prior to a film soundtrack album release. Harris made his debut in Telugu cinema with Vasu. He received the Filmfare Award for Best Music Director – Tamil, Tamil Nadu State Film Award for Best Music Director and ITFA Best Music Director Award for Kaakha Kaakha, starring Suriya and Jyothika. This film directed by Gautham Vasudev Menon was a huge commercial success and the songs met with great critical acclaim. In its Telugu remake Gharshana two new songs apart from the Tamil version were added to suit the taste of Telugu audience. The song Uyirin Uyire reused as Cheliya Cheliya in Telugu and Khwabon Khwabon in Hindi had effective use of gibberish words which later became a signature element in Harris songs.

Harris once again paired up with director Jeeva on Ullam Ketkumae after 12B. The music was appreciated for its excellency and synergy with the atmosphere in and out of the movie. Director S. Shankar, noted leading director of Tamil cinema, paired up with Harris in his magnum opus Anniyan. It was the first time Shankar did not team up with A. R. Rahman. Shankar later mentioned that working with Harris was an experience. The soundtrack album received several awards including Tamil Nadu State Film Award for Best Music Director and Filmfare Award for Best Music Director – Tamil. The next film he scored was Ghajini directed by AR Murugadoss, for which he received Tamil Nadu State Film Award for Best Music Director. Critics noted that the album had "scintillating, party-hopping numbers", which resulted in a huge commercial success in audio sales; the track "Sutum Vizhi" crossed 20 million downloads and turned out to be phenomenally successful. Harris crafted a necessary classiness into Gautham Menon's blockbuster crime thriller Vettaiyaadu Vilaiyaadu starring Kamal Haasan. Gautham revealed that he shares the entire script with Harris and provides input's from his side."Harris and I, when we work together, we put in a lot of effort. I give him the entire script. I give him inputs. When we sat down for Vettaiyaadu Vilaiyaadu, I told him to do away with the traditional pallavi-charanam format in the Manjal veyyil song." Harris once again ventured into Telugu films with a successful album Sainikudu. The music album of the film was released simultaneously in 10 chosen venues from five different countries. Gautham Menon who considers the music and background score of Harris as a major asset of his films, once again teamed up with Harris on a romantic-thriller Pachaikili Muthucharam. The soundtracks of Pachaikili Muthucharam are appraised as melancholic, lilting, mysterious, and alternatively catchy. Harris' collaboration with Jeeva continued with Unnale Unnale. The music album oozing with energy all through proved to be a cut above the rest. His next Telugu venture Munna had a good commercial reception, and the song Manasa fetched a Filmfare Best Singer Female award to Sadhana Sargam. With the following album Bheema, Harris continued his mettle with all the six songs. The track Siru Parvaiyalae used Pashto words in interludes. The album was praised for bringing up visual recapitulation from audio. Harris used a live orchestra of 84 members for the action cop film Sathyam. In 2009, Harris Jayaraj was signed in for Vikram Kumar's 24, which was to star Vikram. He was also signed in for the Malayalam film Yoddha 2, starring Mohanlal. But both films were subsequently shelved.

In Anegan, Harris's "Danga Maari Oodhari", featuring lyrics in North Madras slang become an instant chart-buster. After a hiatus of 6 years, Harris collaborated with Gautham Vasudev Menon for the action cop film Yennai Arindhaal. The soundtrack received positive reviews from critics and according to Behindwoods, it was the most played album of 2015 in Chennai radio stations.

Live in concert

In 2011, Harris announced his first musical world tour titled "Harris on the Edge". The tour featured live performance of Harris all over the world accompanied by a troupe of Tamil playback singers, including Karthik, Haricharan, Chinmayi, Tippu, Harini, Naresh Iyer, Harish Raghavendra, Krish, Aalap Raju, KK, Benny Dayal, Andrea, Suvi Suresh, Sunitha Sarathy, Srilekha Parthasarathy and Shweta Mohan and international musicians and dancers. The event was coordinated by Techfront and was directed by A. L. Vijay. The tour kick started in Chennai on 8 October 2011, and later continued in Coimbatore on 23 December 2011 and in Dubai on 4 February 2012. The whole tour was covered by Jaya TV.

Studio H
Harris opened a new studio on 8 January 2017, called "Studio H". The studio consists of the latest audio recording systems and technology. The first song to be composed in the studio was Halena from Iru Mugan. The S3 soundtrack was the first project entirely composed here.

Guest appearances
 2011 Ko - in song 'Aga Naga Naga'

Discography

Notes:
 • Indicates languages of original release.
 ♦ Indicates a film remade in another language with a different cast, retaining Harris as the composer.
 # indicates the soundtrack album has one or more bonus songs composed by a different composer.
 The movie Force has four songs composed by Harris. Film scoring is done by Sameer Phatarpekar with some themes having some of their melodies borrowed from the songs.

Lyricist
 2011 - Engeyum Kadhal - Kulu Kulu Venpani
 2017 - Singam 3  - Hey Wi Wi Wifi

Ad jingles
He composed music for various television commercials including a Coca-Cola commercial featuring Vijay. In 2008, he composed for Herova? Zerova? ad campaign which Suriya initiated under the Agaram Foundation, working to help children who drop out of school early in Tamil Nadu. With the Ministry of Education in Tamil Nadu, he created a short commercial video outlining child poverty, labour and lack of education, titled Herova? Zerova?. The film was written and produced by Sivakumar and also starred Suriya, Vijay, R. Madhavan and Jyothika.

Personal life
Harris is married to Suma Jayaraj, the couple have a son named Samuel Nicholas Harris and a daughter named Karen Nikitha Harris, born in 2006. Nikitha is a playback singer who made her debut through the song Vinnil Vinmeen for the movie Kaappaan, and won a V4U Media award in 2020.

Awards and nominations

Special Honours

Filmfare Awards South
2001: Won – Best Music Director - Minnale
2003: Won – Best Music Director - Kaakha Kaakha
2005: Won – Best Music Director - Anniyan
2005: Won – Filmfare Special Award – South - Ghajini
2008: Won – Best Music Director - Vaaranam Aayiram
2009: Won – Best Music Director - Ayan
2002: Nominated - Best Music Director - Vasu
2003: Nominated - Best Music Director - Saamy
2004: Nominated - Best Music Director - Gharshana
2005: Nominated - Best Music Director - Ghajini
2006: Nominated - Best Music Director - Vettaiyaadu Vilaiyaadu
2007: Nominated - Best Music Director - Munna
2007: Nominated - Best Music Director - Unnale Unnale
2009: Nominated - Best Music Director - Aadhavan
2010: Nominated - Best Music Director - Orange
2011: Nominated - Best Music Director - Ko
2011: Nominated - Best Music Director - 7aum Arivu
2012: Nominated - Best Music Director - Thuppakki
2015: Nominated - Best Music Director - Yennai Arindhaal
2016: Nominated - Best Music Director - Iru Mugan

Tamil Nadu State Film Awards
2003: Won – Best Music Director – Kaakha Kaakha
2005: Won – Best Music Director – Anniyan & Ghajini
2009: Won – Best Music Director – Kalaimamani Award
2011: Won – Best Music Director – Ko

Vijay Awards
2008: Won - Best Music Director - Vaaranam Aayiram
2009: Won - Best Music Director - Aadhavan
2008: Won - Favorite Song of the Year - "Ava Enna" from Vaaranam Aayiram
2011: Won - Favorite Song of the Year - "Enamo Aedho" from Ko
2012: Won - Favorite Song of the Year - "Google Google" from Thuppakki
2007: Nominated - Best Music Director - Unnale Unnale
2011: Nominated - Best Music Director - Engeyum Kaadhal
2012: Nominated - Best Music Director - Nanban
2011: Nominated - Best Background Score - Ko
2008: Nominated - Favourite Song of the Year - "Mundhinam" from Vaaranam Aayiram
2008: Nominated - Favourite Song of the Year - "Nenjukkul" from Vaaranam Aayiram
2009: Nominated - Favourite Song of the Year - "Hasili Fisili" from Aadhavan
2009: Nominated - Favourite Song of the Year - "Vizhi Moodi" from Ayan
2012: Nominated - Favourite Song of the Year - "Venaam Machan" from Oru Kal Oru Kannadi
2014: Nominated - Favourite Song of the Year - "Aathangara Orathil" from Yaan

Vijay Music Awards
2011: Won - Best Music Director - Engeyum Kaadhal
2011: Won - Popular Song of the Year - "Enamo Aedho" from Ko
2011: Won - Best Western Song - "Nangaai" from Engeyum Kaadhal

International Tamil Film Awards (ITFA)
2003: Won - Best Music Director – Kaakha Kaakha
2005: Won - Best Music Director –  Ghajini
2008: Won - Best Music Director – Vaaranam Aayiram

Mirchi Music Awards South
2009: Won – Best Album of the Year – Ayan
2009: Won – Mirchi Listeners' Choice for Best Album – Ayan
2010: Won – Best Album of the Year – Orange
2010: Won – Mirchi Listeners' Choice for Best Album – Orange
2010: Won – Mirchi Listeners' Choice for Best Song – "Nenu Nuvvantu" from Orange
2011: Won – Best Song of the Year – "Enamo Aedho" from Ko

Edison Awards
2009: Won – Best Music Director – Ayan
2011: Won – Best Music Director – Ko
2015: Won - Favourite Song of the Year - "Danga Maari" from Anegan
2015: Nominated - Best Music Director  - Anegan

South Indian International Movie Awards (SIIMA)
2012: Won - Best Music Director – Thuppakki
2015: Nominated - Best Music Director – Yennai Arindhaal
2016: Nominated - Best Music Director – Iru Mugan

MGR Sivaji Cinema Awards 
2019 - Best Music Director - Kaappaan
2019 - Mellisai Mannar M.S.Viswanathan Award

Isaiaruvi Tamil Music Awards
2007 - Best Youthful Album of the Year- Unnale Unnale
2007 - Most Listened Song of the Year- "June Ponal" from Unnale Unnale
2008 - Best Romantic Song of the Year- "Anbe En Anbe" from Dhaam Dhoom
2008 - Best Album of the Year - Vaaranam Aayiram
2008 - Best Music Director - Vaaranam Aayiram
2009 - Best Romantic Song of the Year - "Vizhi Moodi Yosithal" from Ayan
2009 - Best Album of the Year - Aadhavan
2009 - Best Music Director of the Year - Aadhavan

Big FM Awards
2010 – Best Music Director – Orange

 Big Tamil Melody Awards
2011 - Best Music Director - Engeyum Kaadhal
2011 - Best Album of the Year - Engeyum Kaadhal
2012 - Best Music Director - Nanban

Chennai Times Film Awards
2011 - Best Music Director – Ko

South Scope Awards
2008 – Most Stylish Music Director – Dhaam Dhoom
2009 – Best Music Director – Ayan

Stardust Awards
2011: Nominated - Standout Performance by a Music Director - Force

References

External links

 
 

1975 births
Living people
Tamil film score composers
Alumni of Trinity College of Music
Tamil musicians
Telugu film score composers
Tamil Nadu State Film Awards winners
Filmfare Awards South winners
Recipients of the Kalaimamani Award
Musicians from Chennai
Indian Tamil people
Indian Christians
People from Tamil Nadu
Jingle composers
Indian male film score composers
21st-century Indian composers